Genga may refer to:

Genga, Japanese animation terminology for key animation drawings, literally meaning "original pictures"
Genga, California, former Tongva village
Genga, Marche, Italy
Genga, Liberia
Girolamo Genga (c. 1476 – 1551), Italian artist
Bernardino Genga (1620–1690), Italian artist
Gengadharan Nair (1944–2007), Malaysian judge